The Middle River is a river in the parish of Braddan in the Isle of Man which runs from Colooneys Farm area on the Marown parish border down under the original Fairy Bridge to Oakhill where it makes a 90 degree turn north eastwards to run past the Pulrose Golf Club to join the River Douglas near The Nunnery.

Rivers of the Isle of Man